FC Seoul Reserves are the reserve team of FC Seoul. Reserve team is member of the R League (Reserve League). 

FC Seoul Academy is the youth system of FC Seoul.  The academy consists of U-18 Team, U-15 Team, U-12 Team and Future of FC Seoul. The Future of Seoul U-12, U-15, and U-18 are considered to be a part of the academy, while the rest are for young players playing as a hobby. U-18 Team is a member of the K League Junior (Youth League).

FC Seoul Reserves

History 
FC Seoul Reserves was built in 1990 for first R League. But R League existed just for one year. 

In 2000, R League relaunched, and FC Seoul Reserves was rebuilt for competition.
There are many players who played for reserves including Lee Chung-Yong, Song Jin-Hyung, Ko Myong-Jin, Ahn Sang-Hyun.

Coaching staff

Honours 
 R League
  Winners (3): 2000, 2002, 2004
  Runners-up (2): 2001, 2005

Statistics

R League - Season by Season Records

R League - Knockout Stage Records

Award Winners 

 R League MVP Award Winners 

 R League Top Scorer Award Winners

FC Seoul Academy

History 
FC Seoul didn't have a practical youth system by 2006. In 2007, FC Seoul affiliated with Dongbuk High School FC as U-18 team.

In 2012 December, FC Seoul established U-18 team and U-15 team at Osan Schools.

In 2014 December, FC Seoul established U-12 Team. FC Seoul constructed youth system.

Coaching staff

FC Seoul U-18 Team 

FC Seoul U-18 Team is Osan High School FC in Seoul. Osan High School FC is founded on December 2012.
From 2007 to 2012, FC Seoul U-18 Team was Dongbuk High School FC.

Honours 
 K League Junior
 Winners (2) : 2009, 2020 Group A
 Korea High School Football Championship (Spring)
 Winners (1) : 2019

Statistics 
 2008-2012 seasons were Dongbuk High School FC period.

K League Junior - Season by Season Records

K League Junior - Knockout Stage Records

Rookie Draft 

 (Univ.) means player who go to university then back to FC Seoul
 (After Univ.) means player who is joined FC Seoul after entering university

Notable graduate 
  Moon Ki-Han,  Kim Hyun-Sung,  Jung Seung-Yong,  Kim Won-Sik,   Shim Je-hyeok

FC Seoul U-15 Team 

FC Seoul U-15 Team is Osan Middle School FC in Seoul. Osan Middle School FC is founded on December 2012.

FC Seoul U-12 Team 

FC Seoul U-12 Team founded in December 2014. FC Seoul U-12 Team scout outstanding players of Future of FC Seoul.

Future of FC Seoul 

FC Seoul ran a soccer camp for hobby in 1990s and 2000s, then known as LG Cheetahs Soccer Camp and Little FC Seoul.

In October 2012, Renamed Future of FC Seoul, FC Seoul have been running the Future of FC Seoul (FOS) Program the Youth Football Academy to find promising young players for the future and also planning and involving in Social Contribution Events to enhance the football infrastructure and environment. 

Outstanding players in Future of FC Seoul can transfer to U-12 team.

Notable graduate 
  Ju Se-jong,  Ahn Hyeon-beom

See also 
 FC Seoul
 R League

References

External links
 FC Seoul Official Website 
 Future of FC Seoul Official Website 
 Future of FC Seoul Official Facebook  
 Future of FC Seoul Official Blog 
 K League Junior Fixtures and Results 
 K League Junior Official Blog 
 Nation Youth Football League Fixtures and Results 

Y2
Seoul
Seoul